Dartlo is a village in the Akhmeta Municipality, Kakheti Region, Georgia. 

The village is known for its historic stone towers and houses, and the Dartlo church.

Dartlo is part of the historical region of Tusheti and is located about 12km from Omalo, the main village of the region.

Population 
As of the 2014 national census, Dartlo had 0 permanent residents, down from 9 in 2002.

Gallery

References 

Populated places in Kakheti